Stroll may refer to:

 A walk
 A daycation

Dance
 The Stroll, 1950s dance
 Jitterbug Stroll, 1990s swing-line dance
 Charleston Stroll, 2010s swing-line dance

People
 Avrum Stroll (1921–2013), American research professor
 Edson Stroll (1929–2011), American actor
 Lance Stroll (born 1998), Canadian Formula One driver
 Lawrence Stroll (born 1959), Canadian businessman

Other uses
 "The Stroll" (song), 1957 song by The Diamonds
 The Stroll (film) (Russian: Прогулка; 'Progulka'), 2003 Russian drama film
 Stroll (album), 2013 album by Big D and the Kids Table

See also

 
 Esplanade